Ivan Popović (Serbian Cyrillic: Иван Поповић; born 3 November 1979) is a Serbian football defender.

External links
 Profile and stats at Srbijafudbal
 Stats until 2003 at Dekisa.Tripod
 Ivan Popović Stats at Utakmica.rs

Living people
1979 births
Footballers from Belgrade
Serbian footballers
Serbian expatriate footballers
FK Čukarički players
FK Vojvodina players
FK Obilić players
FK Smederevo players
Serbian SuperLiga players
Újpest FC players
Expatriate footballers in Hungary
Association football defenders